Geoffrey Alan Hudson (14 October 1931 – December 2015) was an English professional footballer. Born in Leeds, he played for Bradford Park Avenue, Bradford City, Halifax Town, Exeter City, Crewe Alexandra, Gillingham, Lincoln City and Rotherham United between 1950 and 1967. He died in Barnsley in December 2015 at the age of 84.

References

1931 births
2015 deaths
Footballers from Leeds
English footballers
Gillingham F.C. players
Bradford (Park Avenue) A.F.C. players
Bradford City A.F.C. players
Halifax Town A.F.C. players
Exeter City F.C. players
Crewe Alexandra F.C. players
Lincoln City F.C. players
English Football League players
Rotherham United F.C. players
Cambridge United F.C. players
Southend United F.C. managers
Association football fullbacks
English football managers